The Acropolis of ancient Methana (also known as Acropolis Paliokastro) is located 1 km from the town of Megalochori in the volcanic peninsula of Methana.

History
It was first built in the Mycenaean times. It was rebuilt and destroyed later during the Roman and the Byzantine times.

Construction
It was built from andesite and dacite rocks from the volcanic mountain nearby. The small acropolis is located on a small lava dome.

Significance
Around the acropolis, Pausanias described the ancient market (Agorá) and a sanctuary of Isis and Hermes. Remains of the ancient town Methana can be found around the Paliocastro and some Roman columns in front of the Agios Nikolaos chapel located nearby.

References

Ancient Greek buildings and structures
Troizinia-Methana